Stuffed ham is a variety of ham in which cabbage, kale, onions, spices and seasonings are chopped and mixed, then stuffed into deep slits slashed in a whole corned or smoked ham. The ham is covered with extra stuffing, wrapped in a cloth to hold everything together, and then boiled until the meat and greens are fully cooked. Stuffed ham is believed to have originated in Southern Maryland, specifically in St. Mary's County, and remains popular in that region to this day. Often used as a Christmas ham, this preparation has been popular for at least 200 years. Typically the ham has a distinctively spicy flavor due to added seasoning. Recipes vary widely, since they are traditionally passed down from one family member to another.

Salmonella vector
In 1997, improperly prepared stuffed ham served at the Our Lady of the Wayside Catholic Church fund-raising dinner in Chaptico, Maryland was responsible for one of the largest multi-drug resistant Salmonella Heidelberg outbreaks in Maryland which sickened 750 people and caused two deaths. The CDC documented the incident in the journal Emerging Infectious Diseases.

See also

 List of ham dishes
 List of smoked foods
 List of stuffed dishes

References

Further reading

Maryland cuisine
Ham dishes
Smoked meat
St. Mary's County, Maryland
Stuffed dishes
American pork dishes
Cabbage dishes